William Clarence Owens Jr. (born April 2, 1947) was a  Democratic member of the North Carolina General Assembly representing the state's first House district, including constituents in Camden, Currituck, Pasquotank and Tyrrell counties.  A businessman from Elizabeth City, North Carolina, Owens is serving in his ninth term in the state House (2011–2012 session).

Recent electoral history

References

External links
 Bill Owens profile – North Carolina General Assembly website

External links

1947 births
Democratic Party members of the North Carolina House of Representatives
Living people
21st-century American politicians
People from Elizabeth City, North Carolina